The Kahnawake Sports Complexe is a 4,000-seat multi-purpose arena in Kahnawake 14, Quebec.  It is home to the Les Condors de Kahnawake Tier II Junior "A" ice hockey team of the Quebec Junior AAA Hockey League.

External links
Official site

Indoor arenas in Quebec
Indoor ice hockey venues in Canada
Sports venues in Quebec
Buildings and structures in Montérégie